This article contains a list of presidents of the Republic of Seychelles.

Presidents (1976–present)

Notes

Timeline

Latest election

See also
Seychelles
Politics of Seychelles
List of colonial governors of Seychelles
Vice-President of Seychelles
Prime Minister of Seychelles
Lists of office-holders

References

External links
World Statesmen – Seychelles

Seychelles

Presidents
1976 establishments in Seychelles